Sinai Vessel is the stage name of American indie rock musician Caleb Cordes from North Carolina. The project was originally a trio, but now consists just of Cordes.

History
Sinai Vessel began as the solo project of musician Caleb Cordes. Since then, it had expanded into a three-piece band, but is now back to a solo project. In 2011, Sinai Vessel released their first album titled Labor Pains. They followed that release in 2013 with an EP titled Profanity. In 2015, Count Your Lucky Stars Records released a split with the bands Dowsing, Sinai Vessel, Long Knives, and The Cardboard Swords. On January 27, 2017, Sinai Vessel released their second full-length album after signing to Tiny Engines titled Brokenlegged. In 2020, Cordes released his third album as Sinai Vessel titled Ground Aswim.

Band members
Current
Caleb Cordes (vocals, guitars)
Former
Daniel Hernandez (bass)
Joshua Herron (drums)

Discography
Studio albums
Labor Pains (2011, self-released)
Brokenlegged (2017, Tiny Engines)
Ground Aswim (2020, self-released)
EPs
Profanity (2013, Flannel Gurl Records)
Splits
Dowsing, Sinai Vessel, The Cardboard Swords, Long Knives (2015, Count Your Lucky Stars)

References

Musical groups from North Carolina
Musical groups established in 2011
2011 establishments in North Carolina
Count Your Lucky Stars Records artists
Tiny Engines artists